Lindsay Smith (born 13 January 2000) is an Australian professional rugby league footballer who plays as a  or  for the Penrith Panthers in the NRL.

Background
Smith played junior rugby league for the St Marys Saints and attended Westfields Sports High School.

Playing career

Early career
In 2016, Smith represented the New South Wales under-16s team and won the NRL Schoolboy Cup with Westfields Sports High School.

Smith represented the Australian Schoolboys in 2017.

In March 2020, Smith signed a contract upgrade to join Penrith's top 30 squad for the 2021 and 2022 seasons. He joined the top 30 squad effective immediately in August 2020, following the departures of Kaide Ellis and Jed Cartwright from the club.

2021
In round 13 of the 2021 NRL season, Smith made his first grade debut for Penrith against the Wests Tigers at Leichhardt Oval.

2022
Smith managed to only make three appearances for the Penrith first grade side in 2022. Smith spent most of the year playing for the clubs NSW Cup team. On 25 September, he played for Penrith in the clubs NSW Cup Grand Final victory over Canterbury.

2023
On 18 February, Smith played in Penrith's 13-12 upset loss to St Helens RFC in the 2023 World Club Challenge.

References

External links
Penrith Panthers profile

2000 births
Living people
Australian rugby league players
Penrith Panthers players
Rugby league locks
Rugby league players from Sydney
Rugby league props